The 2016 Elite 10 was held from March 17 to 20, 2016 at The Q Centre in Colwood, British Columbia. It was the fourth Grand Slam of Curling event held in the 2015–16 curling season. The tournament was held between ten teams; nine  teams were joined by two-time Canadian women's champions Team Homan.

Teams
The teams are listed as follows:

Round-robin standings
Final round-robin standings

Round-robin results
All draw times are listed in Pacific Standard Time (UTC−8).

Draw 1
Thursday, March 17, 11:30 am

Draw 2
Thursday, March 17, 4:00 pm

Draw 3
Thursday, March 17, 7:30 pm

Draw 4
Friday, March 18, 8:00 am

Draw 5
Friday, March 18, 11:30 am

Draw 6
Friday, March 18, 3:00 pm

Draw 7
Friday, March 18, 7:30 pm

Playoffs

Quarterfinals
Saturday, March 19, 1:00 pm

Semifinals
Saturday, March 19, 7:30 pm

Final
Sunday, March 20, 1:00 pm

References

External links

2016 in Canadian curling
Curling in British Columbia
Sports competitions in Victoria, British Columbia
2016 in British Columbia